

596001–596100 

|-bgcolor=#f2f2f2
| colspan=4 align=center | 
|}

596101–596200 

|-bgcolor=#f2f2f2
| colspan=4 align=center | 
|}

596201–596300 

|-bgcolor=#f2f2f2
| colspan=4 align=center | 
|}

596301–596400 

|-bgcolor=#f2f2f2
| colspan=4 align=center | 
|}

596401–596500 

|-bgcolor=#f2f2f2
| colspan=4 align=center | 
|}

596501–596600 

|-bgcolor=#f2f2f2
| colspan=4 align=center | 
|}

596601–596700 

|-bgcolor=#f2f2f2
| colspan=4 align=center | 
|}

596701–596800 

|-bgcolor=#f2f2f2
| colspan=4 align=center | 
|}

596801–596900 

|-bgcolor=#f2f2f2
| colspan=4 align=center | 
|}

596901–597000 

|-id=996
| 596996 Suhantzong ||  || Han-Tzong Su (born 1956), a popularizer of astronomy at National Cheng Kung University, Taiwan, who has been translating content of NASA's Astronomy Picture of the Day (APOD) website into Chinese for over two decades. || 
|}

References 

596001-597000